Mississippi State University has had 20 head coaches in the entire 100 year history of the men's basketball program.

Head coaches

 All Stats updated through the 2021 season (as of 2/24/2021).

References

Mississippi State

Mississippi State Bulldogs basketball, men's, coaches